Quandong, quandang or quondong, is a common name for the species Santalum acuminatum (desert, sweet, Western quandong), especially its edible fruit, but may also refer to

 Aceratium concinnum (highroot quandong) 
 Peripentadenia mearsii (buff, grey quandong) 
 Elaeocarpus angustifolius (blue quandong) 
 Elaeocarpus arnhemicus (Arnhem Land, bony quandong) 
 Elaeocarpus bancroftii (Kuranda quandong) 
 Elaeocarpus coorangooloo (brown quandong) 
 Elaeocarpus eumundi (eumundi, smooth-leaved quandong) 
 Elaeocarpus ferruginiflorus (rusty leaf quandong) 
 Elaeocarpus foveolatus (white, Northern quandong) 
 Elaeocarpus grandis (brush, blue, white quandong; quandong) 
 Elaeocarpus holopetalus (mountain quandong) 
 Elaeocarpus johnsonii (Kuranda quandong) 
 Elaeocarpus kirtonii (brown-hearted quandong) 
 Elaeocarpus kirtonii (white quandong) 
 Elaeocarpus largiflorens (tropical quandong) 
 Elaeocarpus obovatus (hard quandong) 
 Elaeocarpus reticulatus (Ash quandong) 
 Elaeocarpus ruminatus (brown, grey quandong) 
 Elaeocarpus sericopetalus (Northern, hard, Northern hard quandong) 
 Elaeocarpus williamsianus (hairy quandong) 
 Santalum acuminatum (desert quandong)
 Santalum lanceolatum (desert quandong) 
 Santalum murrayanum (bitter quandong)
 Terminalia cunninghamii (pindan quandong)
 The specific epithet of Amyema quandang, discovered growing on Santalum acuminatum

Australian Aboriginal words and phrases